Sirens is the second studio album by composer and electronic music artist Nicolás Jaar, released on September 30, 2016 by Other People. Influenced by Chilean history and politics, as well as his own personal life, Sirens has received acclaim from both independent music and electronic music publications.

On December 8, 2017, Sirens Deluxe was issued, featuring three bonus songs woven into the album. Jaar said of this version: "this deluxe version of the record is what it should have been all along but i got scared of "coin [In Nine Hands]" and decided against it at the last minute.. but then i started performing coin at every show... i couldn't get it out of me..everything floats to the surface at some point.."

Reception

At Metacritic, which assigns a normalised rating out of 100 to reviews from mainstream critics, Sirens received an average score of 79, based on 15 reviews, indicating "generally favorable reviews". Jonah Bromwich, writing for Pitchfork, gave Sirens a positive review, stating, "Sirens is a thoughtful study in contrasts, both musical and political. It's only Nicolas Jaar's second LP, but it is the mark of an enduring electronic composer"; he gave the album a "Best New Music" designation. Nina Corcoran, writing for Consequence of Sound, said, "Though it seems fleeting, Jaar’s hypnotizing songs cradle you until you reach a point of illumination, a bubble of sound that feels limitless in its elongated, looped second, a dance to softened fragments."

Rolling Stone named it the #1 Electronic Album of 2016.

Accolades

Track listing

CD and digital

Some digital editions include "Wildflowers" as a 5:34-long, unsegued bonus track, whereas the pressings listed below include segues in and out of that song.

Vinyl
Original pressing

"Mirrors", "Killing Time" and "Sirens", together, are the same as "Killing Time" on the standard CD pressing.

Sirens Deluxe

Charts

References

2016 albums
Nicolas Jaar albums